Buzuluk may refer to:

Buzuluk, Orenburg Oblast, a town in Orenburg Oblast in Russia
Buzuluk (inhabited locality), name of several inhabited localities in Russia
Buzuluk (Orenburg Oblast), a river in Orenburg Oblast, Russia
Buzuluk (Volgograd Oblast), a river in Volgograd Oblast, Russia
Bazavluk, a river in Dnipropetrovsk Oblast, Ukraine, also known in Russian as Buzuluk
Buzluq, Azerbaijan, also known as Buzuluk